Queenie Foote (1857 – April 25, 1937), born Eliza S. Nestel, was an American performer, sometimes also billed as The Fairy Queen.

Early life 
Eliza S. Nestel was from Fort Wayne, Indiana, the daughter of blacksmith Daniel Nestel and Henrietta Goebel Nestel. She was a dwarf. Her parents immigrated to the United States from Prussia and Germany; they were both quite tall. She began making public appearances as a child with her older brother Charles, who was also a dwarf, under the management of William Ellinger, and with their father as chaperone.

Career 
Foote and her brother Charles W. Nestel, known as "Commodore Foote", toured in the United States, Canada, Mexico, and Europe. They met with Abraham Lincoln at the White House in February 1864. While in Washington, she was the object of an anatomical study, along with her brother and others.

They met Queen Victoria. They were seen with the Lilliputian Comic Opera Company, working with other performers, including fellow little people Commodore Nutt, Admiral Dot, and Jennie Quigley. Charles rejected the "sideshow" label, saying "My sister and I played only the best of concert and dramatic stages, and neither of us every played in any circus or sideshow," adding "We were actors, not freaks." In 1895 she helped another brother sell jewelry in Ohio. She was injured in 1909; by 1912 they had retired to Fort Wayne.

Personal life 
Nestel died in 1937, aged 80 years, a few days after her brother died.

References

External links 

 Charles Nestel ("Commodore Foote"), Eliza Nestel ("Queenie" or "Fairy Queen"), and Joseph Huntler ("Colonel Small"), full-length studio portrait, in the collection of the Library of Congress.

1857 births
1937 deaths
People from Fort Wayne, Indiana
Entertainers with dwarfism
American circus performers
American people of Prussian descent